Laboriel is a surname. Notable people with the surname include:

Abe Laboriel, Jr. (born 1971), American drummer, son of Abraham
Abraham Laboriel (born 1947), Mexican bass guitarist
Ella Laboriel (born 1949), Mexican singer and actress
Johnny Laboriel (1942–2013), Mexican singer